Born To Live, Born To Love is the debut extended play by Californian electronic rock outfit, Parade of Lights. It was self-released by the band on SoundCloud on September 30, 2012, and was re-released on Bandcamp on March 17, 2013.

Track listing

References

2012 EPs